Excusion is an album by bassist Ray Drummond which was recorded in 1992 and released on the Arabesque label the following year.

Reception

The AllMusic review by Scott Yanow called it an "excellent set" and said "This is one of Ray Drummond's finest recordings to date".

Track listing
All compositions by Ray Drummond except where noted
 "Susanita" – 8:51
 "Penta-Major" – 4:17
 "Prelude" – 1:41
 "Quads" – 9:01
 "Invitation" (Bronisław Kaper, Paul Francis Webster) – 8:35
 "Well, You Needn't"" (Thelonious Monk) – 6:19
 "Andei" (Hermeto Pascoal) – 5:21
 "Blues African" – 8:06
 "Excursion (Suite in 5 Parts): Prologue/Waterfall/Mother Africa/Danse de Joie/Epilogue" – 12:06

Personnel
Ray Drummond – double bass
Craig Handy, Joe Lovano – saxophone, flute
Danilo Perez – piano
Marvin "Smitty" Smith, Mor Thiam – drums, percussion

References

Arabesque Records albums
Ray Drummond albums
1993 albums